Persatuan Sepakbola Sukabumi Indonesia (simply known as Perssi Sukabumi) is an Indonesian football club based in Sukabumi, West Java. They currently compete in the Liga 3.

References

External links

Sukabumi
Sport in West Java
Football clubs in Indonesia
Football clubs in West Java
Association football clubs established in 1948
1948 establishments in Indonesia